Eklakhi is a railway station on the Howrah–New Jalpaiguri line and is located in Maldah district in the Indian state of West Bengal. The Eklakhi–Balurghat branch line connects Balurghat to the trunk line.

Eklakhi–Balurghat line
Extension of the Eklakhi–Balurghat branch line to Hili was announced in the Rail Budget for 2010–11.

References

Railway stations in Malda district
Katihar railway division
Railway junction stations in West Bengal